The action of jumping is central to several sports and activities. Some sports are based almost exclusively on the ability to jump, such as high jump in track and field, whereas in other sports the act of jumping is one of multiple athletic abilities used in the sport, such as basketball.

Track and field
 High jump, in which athletes jump over horizontal bars.
 Long jump, where the objective is to leap horizontally as far as possible.
 Pole vault, in which a person uses a long, flexible pole as an aid to jump over a bar.
 Triple jump, the objective is to leap horizontally as far as possible, in a series of three jumps

Sports
 American football
 Association football ("soccer" in U.S. and Canada)
 Australian Rules football
 Badminton
 Basketball
 Bossaball
 Cheerleading
 Dancing
 Diving - Jumping into water
 Figure skating - Artistic/sporting ice skating
 Gymnastics
 Jump rope
 Martial arts
 Netball - Similar to basketball
 Parkour - Urban jumping and climbing
 Racquetball
 Rugby
 Skateboarding
 Skiing
 Ski jumping
 Squash
 Swimming
 Table tennis
 Team Handball
 Tennis
 Trampolining
 Ultimate - Frisbee competition
 Volleyball
 Jumping Jack - A calisthenic exercise

Animal sports

 Dog agility, in which a dog traverses various obstacles, including jumps.
 Show jumping and Eventing, competitions where a horse jumps over fences.
 Rabbit show jumping
 Fox hunting, in which horses and fox hounds jump over fences and other obstacles.

Sport-related lists
Sports science